Amphoroidea is a genus of isopod of the family Sphaeromatidae, containing the following species:
 Amphoroidea angustata Baker, 1908    
 Amphoroidea australiensis Dana, 1853    
 Amphoroidea elegans Baker, 1911  
 Amphoroidea falcifer G. Thomson, 1879     
 Amphoroidea longipes Hurley & Jansen, 1977    
 Amphoroidea media Hurley & Jansen, 1971    
 Amphoroidea typa H. Milne-Edwards, 1840

References

Sphaeromatidae
Taxa named by Henri Milne-Edwards